Mill Creek is a  long 1st order tributary to Coddle Creek in Cabarrus County, North Carolina.

Course
Mill Creek rises in Enochville, North Carolina and then flows south to join Coddle Creek within Coddle Creek Reservoir about 3 miles southwest of Kannapolis.

Watershed
Mill Creek drains  of area, receives about 46.7 in/year of precipitation, has a wetness index of 442.55, and is about 45% forested.

References

Rivers of North Carolina
Rivers of Cabarrus County, North Carolina
Rivers of Rowan County, North Carolina